Lewis Watkins (ap Gwatkyn, Gwatkyn) (by 1511 – 1547/48), of Llangorse, Breconshire and Upton, Pembrokeshire, was a Welsh politician.

Family
Watkins married Elizabeth (or Isabella) Tame, a daughter of Sir Edmund Tame. Together they had three sons, possibly including fellow Pembroke MP, William Watkin, and two daughters.

Career
He was a Member (MP) of the Parliament of England for Pembroke Boroughs in 1545.

References

1540s deaths
English MPs 1545–1547
People from Brecon
People from Pembrokeshire
Year of birth uncertain